Soumya Swaminathan (born 1989) is a chess player holding the title of International Master (IM) and Woman Grandmaster (WGM) from India. She won the World Junior Girls' Championship 2009 held in Puerto Madryn, Argentina edging out on tiebreak score.
She withdrew from the chess championships held in Iran in 2018 as a protest against the compulsory headscarf rule for women by Irans Islamic government.Deysi Cori and Betül Cemre Yıldız.

Life 
Soumya Swaminathan was the Indian junior girls' champion in 2005, 2006 and 2008. She won the 2010 Indian women's championship with a score of 8½/11. She became the Commonwealth women's champion in 2012 in Chennai. In 2016, she tied for the first place in the women's section of the Moscow Open with Anastasia Bodnaruk and Alexandra Obolentseva, finishing second on tiebreak. Soumya won the bronze medal in the Women's Asian Individual Championship 2016. She was part of the Indian team in the Women's World team Championship 2011, 2013 and 2015. She won the Individual Bronze Medal on Board 5 in the 2013 edition, which was held at Kazakhstan. She has participated in 2 Chess Olympiads, in the years 2012 and 2016. Indian women's team finished 4th in the 2012 Olympiad, thereby winning the 1st prize in the A category, and 5th in the 2016 edition.

She has represented India twice at the Women's World Championships, in 2010 and 2012. She opted herself out of the Asian Team Chess Championship, to be held in Hamadan, Iran, from 26 July – 4 August 2018, characterizing Iran's compulsory headscarf rule as a violation of her personal rights. She crossed 2400 for the 1st time in the October 2018 rating list, thereby completing the requirements for the International Master (Open) title. She also entered the Women's World top 50 for the 1st time in the same list.

Swaminathan married Ajinkya Kurdukar in December 2020.

Achievements 
2007: Woman International Master (WIM)

2009: World Junior Champion

2010: Sahara Best Sportsperson Award (Girls)

2011: Lokmat Sakhi Gaurav Puruskar

2013–14: Shiv Chatrapati Award

2014: Pune Gaurav Puruskar

References

External links

 
 
 
 

1989 births
Living people
Chess woman grandmasters
Indian female chess players
World Junior Chess Champions
Sportspeople from Palakkad
21st-century Indian women
21st-century Indian people
Sportswomen from Kerala